The National Football Foundation (NFF) is a non-profit organization to promote and develop amateur American football on all levels throughout the United States and "developing the qualities of leadership, sportsmanship, competitive zeal and the drive for academic excellence in America's young people." It was founded in 1947 with early leadership from General Douglas MacArthur, longtime Army Black Knights football coach Earl Blaik and journalist Grantland Rice. 

In addition to supporting amateur football on the local level, the National Football Foundation also oversees the support, administration, and operation of the College Football Hall of Fame in Atlanta. The Foundation also tabulated and released the Bowl Championship Series Standings each Fall and hosts an Annual Awards Dinner in December at the Waldorf-Astoria in New York City.

, Archie Manning, a former Ole Miss Rebels football All-American and member of the College Football Hall of Fame, serves as chairman, and Steven J. Hatchell, the former commissioner of the Big 12 Conference and executive director of the FedEx Orange Bowl, serves as president and CEO. The foundation has 120 local chapters distributed among 47 states.  Since 1956, more than 100,000 volunteers have become members.

History
The NFF was incorporated as the National Football Shrine and Hall of Fame on December 8, 1947, in Syracuse, New York by Arthur Evans. Within a year, sportswriter Grantland Rice and Army football coach Earl Blaik had joined the board. The NFF was reorganized in 1954 with 11 schools serving as "founding subscribers": Brown, Dartmouth, Harvard, Manhattan, Michigan, Navy, Notre Dame, Penn, Princeton, Syracuse, and Yale. 

Chet LaRoche became the organization’s first chairman in 1955 and invited General Douglas MacArthur to become chairman of the board in May 1958. The leadership of MacArthur, Blaik, and Rice offered credibility and national prominence to the organization.

Awards
Among its other programs and initiatives includes the facilitation of the Play It Smart program, which places a trained "academic coach" who turns football teams into learning teams in underserved high schools across the country, and the awarding of the William V. Campbell Trophy, referred to in many circles as the "Academic Heisman".  In spring 2007, the NFF launched the NFF Hampshire Honor Society, a recognition program for players who excel both on the field and in the classroom. Inductees must have been a starter in their final collegiate season and have earned a 3.2 cumulative GPA for their undergraduate degree.

The NFF issues a number of awards, including:

National Scholar-Athlete Awards
Founded in 1959, the award is presented each season to the nation's top scholar-athletes for excellence in academics, athletics and leadership. Each year, between 15 and 17 scholar-athletes are chosen from the NCAA Divisions I (both I-A/FBS and I-AA/FCS), II and III and the NAIA and awarded a $18,000 scholarship. One of the recipients is chosen and awarded the William V. Campbell Trophy (formerly the Draddy Trophy).

Notable former National Scholar-Athletes in the NFL include Ryan Tannehill (Texas A&M, 2011) and Joe Thomas (Wisconsin, 2006) and Super Bowl winners Peyton (Tennessee, 1997) and Eli Manning (Mississippi, 2003), Drew Brees (Purdue, 2000), Jonathan Vilma (Miami, 2003) and Dennis Dixon (Oregon, 2007). Non-sporting former recipients include Emmy and Golden Globe-nominated actor Mark Harmon (UCLA), NASA astronaut and USAF flight test engineer Michael S. Hopkins (Illinois), former USAF pilot and incumbent Hampden–Sydney College President Christopher B. Howard (U.S. Air Force Academy) and NBC anchor Stone Phillips (Yale).

National Football Foundation Gold Medal

The Gold Medal, the NFF’s highest honor, has been presented to seven U.S. Presidents, four U.S. Generals, three U.S. Admirals, one U.S. Supreme Court Justice, 25 Corporate CEOs and Chairmen. The most recent recipient of the award was Mark Harmon, in 2019.

Distinguished American Award

Presented on special occasions when a truly deserving individual emerges, the award honors someone who has applied the character building attributes learned from amateur sport in their business and personal life, exhibiting superior leadership qualities in education, amateur athletics, business and in the community. The award was most recently bestowed in 2016, to William H. McRaven.

MacArthur Bowl

Every year, the National Football Foundation awards the MacArthur Bowl to the NCAA Division I Football Bowl Subdivision (FBS) college football team determined to be the national champion. The award recipients since 2000 are:

2000: Oklahoma Sooners
2001: Miami Hurricanes
2002: Ohio State Buckeyes
2003: LSU Tigers
2004: vacated
2005: Texas Longhorns
2006: Florida Gators
2007: LSU Tigers
2008: Florida Gators
2009: Alabama Crimson Tide
2010: Auburn Tigers
2011: Alabama Crimson Tide
2012: Alabama Crimson Tide
2013: Florida State Seminoles
2014: Ohio State Buckeyes
2015: Alabama Crimson Tide
2016: Clemson Tigers
2017: Alabama Crimson Tide
2018: Clemson Tigers
2019: LSU Tigers
2020: Alabama Crimson Tide
2021: Georgia Bulldogs

John L. Toner Award

The annual award is given to an athletic director who has demonstrated superior administrative abilities and shown outstanding dedication to college athletics and particularly college football. The award's namesake and first recipient served as the head football coach at the University of Connecticut (UConn) from 1966 to 1970 and as the school's athletic director from 1969 to 1987.

Note: * = posthumously

1997: John L. Toner
1998: Doug Dickey
1999: Jake Crouthamel and Davey Nelson*
2000: Frank Broyles
2001: Milo R. "Mike" Lude
2002: Bill Byrne
2003: Andy Geiger and John Clune*
2004: Vince Dooley
2005: Jack Lengyel
2006: DeLoss Dodds
2007: Jeremy Foley
2008: Gene Smith
2009: Jim Weaver
2010: Robert Mulcahy
2011: vacated
2012: Mal Moore
2013: Joe Castiglione
2014: Kevin White
2015: Mark Hollis
2016: Chet Gladchuk
2017: Dan Guerrero
2018: Thomas Beckett and Bob Scalise
2019: Deborah Yow
2020: Jack Swarbrick

Source:

Chris Schenkel Award
Named in honor of broadcaster Chris Schenkel, the award is given annually to distinctive individuals in broadcasting with ties to a university.

 1996: Chris Schenkel
 1997: Jack Cristil
 1998: Max Falkenstien
 1999: Jack Fleming
 2000: Ray Christensen
 2001: Frank Fallon (Baylor)
 2002: Bob Brooks (Iowa)
 2003: Larry Munson
 2004: Bob Robertson
 2005: Tony Roberts
 2006: Johnny Holliday
 2007: Bill Hillgrove
 2008: Bob Curts (Idaho) & Dick Galiette (Yale)
 2009: Larry Zimmer (Colorado)
 2010: Joe Starkey
 2011: Woody Durham
 2012: Bob Barry Sr.
 2013: Gene Deckerhoff
 2014: Frank Beckmann
 2015: Jim Hawthorne
 2016: Bob Rondeau
 2017: Jon Teicher (UTEP)
 2018: Dave South (Texas A&M)
 2019: Eli Gold
 2020: Dave Walsh (Wyoming)

Source:

Poll

The poll was started in 2014; 10 members of the NFF vote in a poll in partnership with the Football Writers Association of America.

References

External links
 

American football mass media
College football awards organizations
College Football Hall of Fame
Sports organizations established in 1947
1947 establishments in the United States
Sports charities
College football championships